Squid-Boy (Samuel "Sammy" Paré) is a fictional character appearing in American comic books published by Marvel Comics. Created by Chuck Austen and Ron Garney, the character is depicted as a 10-year-old mutant and as a student at the Xavier Institute for Higher Learning.

Publication history
The character first appeared in Uncanny X-Men #410, published in 2002. It was createad by writer Chuck Austen and artist Ron Garney.

Fictional character biography
Sammy Paré is a 10-year-old Canadian boy whose genetic mutation causes him to physically resemble a fish. The physical nature of his mutation causes his classmates to ridicule him. Sammy considers using a gun to shoot his tormentors, but before he can do so, he is visited by Professor X and Beast, who recruit him to enroll at the Xavier Institute for Higher Learning in New York. Beast and Professor X do this with full knowledge of the weapon Sammy is carrying around; he is convinced to give it up. Sammy, with his parents' approval, chooses to enroll at the school for mutants in order to pursue an education free from persecution.

On the return trip to the Institute, Professor X takes a detour to Ireland to aid in an X-Men mission at Cassidy Keep. Sammy saves Juggernaut (Cain Marko) from drowning in the ocean, which begins a friendship between the two. Cain subsequently reforms and becomes a surrogate father to Sammy, who also becomes friends with Carter Ghazikhanian and Icarus from the New Mutants.

Sammy's mother eventually finds out about his relationship with Cain and calls upon the Canadian super-team Alpha Flight to bring the boy home. Sometime after Sammy's departure, Juggernaut suspects that Sammy's father Claude is physically abusing him. Cain, who suffered similar abuse at the hands of his own father, decides to visit Sammy to investigate. When he and Northstar arrive at Sammy's home in Vancouver they find the boy covered in bruises. Cain snaps and severely beats Claude, destroying the Paré home in the process. He is subdued by Alpha Flight.

When Cain is subsequently incarcerated for violating his parole, Sammy's mother testifies on his behalf. After Juggernaut's release, Sammy returns to the Institute with his mother, who entertains the thought of a romantic relationship with Cain.

Later, Juggernaut infiltrates the Brotherhood of Mutants, working as a double agent for the X-Men. When Sammy stumbles upon a meeting of the group outside the school grounds, he assumes that Juggernaut betrayed the X-Men and lashes out at him. Black Tom Cassidy uses his control over plants to cause a group of vines to distort and crush Sammy's body mortally wounding him. With his last breath, Sammy tells Cain that he hates him for what he'd done. He then dies, causing Cain to snap again and attack the Brotherhood who were then subdued with the help of the other X-Men.

Although the Brotherhood is defeated, Cain feels responsible for Sammy's death. When Tom's humanity is restored after M-Day, he shows remorse for killing the child.

Powers and abilities
Squid-boy is a mutant with the ability to speak and breathe underwater. His body has many fish-like characteristics, such as orange scaly skin and a dorsal fin. He has many physical adaptations to allow him to survive underwater, such as gills, webbed feet and hands and a slender frame.

In other media
Squid-Boy appears in Wolverine and the X-Men voiced by Dominic Janes. He and his mother (depicted as a mutant here) first appear in the episode "X-Calibre" as refugees on a ship bound for the mutant safe-haven Genosha along with Network, Pixie, Shatter, and other unnamed mutants. He befriends Nightcrawler on the ship and assists him with the others when they are attacked by the ship crew and, later, Spiral and her Reavers from the Mojoverse. He uses his underwater ability to help Nightcrawler repair the ship. Squid-Boy also infiltrates Spiral's ship. When Spiral threatens Sammy, Nightcrawler rescues him and Squid-Boy and the other mutants are once again bound for Genosha. In the episode "Foresight" Pt. 2, Squid-Boy makes a cameo in the crossfire of the Sentinels attacking Genosha. He and his mother survive the attack.

References

External links
 Squid-Boy at Marvel.com
 Squid-Boy at Marvel Wiki

Marvel Comics mutants
Fictional Canadian people